Gösta Ragnar Bengtsson (25 July 1897 – 19 January 1984) was a sailor from Sweden, who represented his native country at the 1920 Summer Olympics in Ostend, Belgium. Bengtsson took the gold in the 30m² Skerry Cruiser.

References

Sources
 
 

Swedish male sailors (sport)
Sailors at the 1920 Summer Olympics – 30m2 Skerry cruiser
Olympic sailors of Sweden
1897 births
1984 deaths
Kullaviks Kanot- och Kappseglingsklubb sailors
Medalists at the 1920 Summer Olympics
Olympic gold medalists for Sweden
Olympic medalists in sailing
Sportspeople from Gothenburg
20th-century Swedish people